Ischnocnema randorum is a species of frog in the family Brachycephalidae.
It is endemic to Brazil.
Its natural habitat is subtropical or tropical moist lowland forest.
It is threatened by habitat loss.

References

randorum
Endemic fauna of Brazil
Amphibians of Brazil
Taxonomy articles created by Polbot
Amphibians described in 1985